Postnationalism or non-nationalism is the process or trend by which nation states and national identities lose their importance relative to cross-nation and self-organized or supranational and global entities as well as local entities. Although postnationalism is not strictly considered the antonym of nationalism, the two terms and their associated assumptions are antithetic as postnationalism is an internationalistic process. There are several factors that contribute to aspects of postnationalism, including economic, political, and cultural elements. Increasing globalization of economic factors (such as the expansion of international trade with raw materials, manufactured goods, and services, and the importance of multinational corporations and internationalization of financial markets) have shifted emphasis from national economies to global ones.

At the same time, socio-political power is partially transferred from national authorities to supernational entities, such as multinational corporations, the United Nations, the European Union, the North American Free Trade Agreement (NAFTA), and NATO. In addition, media and entertainment industries are becoming increasingly global and facilitate the formation of trends and opinions on a supranational scale. Migration of individuals or groups between countries contributes to the formation of postnational identities and beliefs, even though attachment to citizenship and national identities often remains important.

Postnationalism and human rights 
In the scholarly literature, postnationalism is linked to the expansion of international human rights law and norms.  International human rights norms are reflected in a growing stress on the rights of individuals in terms of their "personhood," not just their citizenship. International human rights law does not recognize the right of entry to any state by non-citizens, but demands that individuals should be judged increasingly on universal criteria not particularistic criteria (such as blood descent in ethnicity, or favoring a particular sex). This has impacted citizenship and immigration law, especially in western countries. The German parliament, for example, has felt pressure to, and has diluted (if not eradicated), citizenship based on ethnic descent, which had caused German-born Turks, for example, to be excluded from German citizenship. Scholars identified with this argument include Yasemin Soysal, David Jacobson, and Saskia Sassen.

In the European Union 
The European integration has created a system of supranational entities and is often discussed in relationship to the concept of postnationalism.

In Canada 
During the 2011 election, John Ibbitson when describing what he describes the fading issues of the "Laurentian Consensus" argued that they were responsible for turning Canada into the first post national state.   In 2015, Canadian Prime Minister Justin Trudeau while defining Canadian values declared his country to be the world’s first postnational state. In 2019, Robert Dutrisac writing in Le Devoir, associated with multiculturalism, which he described as an ideology associated with English Canada. While, John Weissenberger associated the Trudeau description as an argument that Laurentian Elite have" diluted the “Laurentian” nature of the class and boosted their disdain for national character."

In the media 
Catherine Frost, professor of political science at McMaster University, argues that while the Internet and online social relations forge social and political bonds across national borders, they do not have "the commitment or cohesiveness needed to underpin a demanding new mode of social and political relations". Nonetheless, it has been argued the increasing options of obtaining virtual citizenship from established nations (e.g., E-Residency of Estonia) and micronations can be seen as examples of what citizenship might look like in a post-national world.

In sports 
Postnational trends have been evident in professional sports. Simon Kuper called the 2008 European soccer championship (UEFA Euro 2008) "the first postnational" European Championship. He argues that during the tournament both for players and fans sportsmanship and enjoyment of the event were more important than national rivalries or even winning.

See also 
 Anti-globalization movement
 Digital currency
 Global citizenship
 Identity politics
 Transnationalism
 Tribe (Internet)
 Types of nationalism
 World Wide Web
 Constitutional patriotism
 Civic nationalism

References

Bibliography 
 

 
Globalization
Political science terminology